George Hsieh (born 5 October 1975) is a Taiwanese politician. He is currently the Mayor of Keelung City since 25 December 2022.

Education and non-political career
After earning a bachelor's degree in sociology from the University of Southern California, Hsieh attended the Massachusetts Institute of Technology. He previously worked for The China Post and founded Hualien Media International.

Political career
Hsieh renounced US citizenship to join the 2004 legislative elections as a member of the People First Party. He joined the Kuomintang in 2006, and represented Keelung in the Legislative Yuan until 2016. In 2009, he proposed an amendment to the Computer-Processed Personal Data Protection Act that would make it legal for elected officials to examine personal records without informing the individual subject to investigation. The next year, Hsieh was named the co-chair of the Judiciary and Organic Laws and Statutes Committee. In 2013, Next Magazine reported that he and a small group of legislators had been subject to wiretapping by the Ministry of Justice since 2011. Hsieh was the party's top choice to run for the mayoralty of Keelung City in 2014, after original candidate Huang Ching-tai's nomination had been withdrawn. He repeatedly refused the mayoral nomination and campaigned for Hsieh Li-kung instead. In February 2015, George Hsieh announced that he would not seek reelection, because his party had been soundly defeated in the November 2014 local elections.

In May 2022, the Kuomintang nominated Hsieh as its candidate for the Keelung mayoralty in the local elections. Hsieh defeated Democratic Progressive Party candidate and legislator .

References

Living people
Kuomintang Members of the Legislative Yuan in Taiwan
Members of the 6th Legislative Yuan
Members of the 7th Legislative Yuan
Members of the 8th Legislative Yuan
Keelung Members of the Legislative Yuan
1975 births
Massachusetts Institute of Technology alumni
University of Southern California alumni
People First Party Members of the Legislative Yuan
Former United States citizens